Maxim Ivanov (born 24 November 1967, Sverdlovsk) is a Russian political figure and a deputy of the 7th and 8th State Dumas. 

From 1993 to 1995, he worked in the Federal Tax Police Service in Novosibirsk. He continued his career at the Department for Combating Economic Crimes. From 2004 to 2010, he served as an assistant to the deputy of the 5th State Duma Igor Barinov. On March 14, 2010, Ivanov was elected deputy of the Legislative Assembly of Sverdlovsk Oblast. In 2016, he became a deputy of the 7th State Duma from the Sverdlovsk Oblast constituency. Since September 2021,  he has served as a deputy of the 8th State Duma.

References

1967 births
Living people
United Russia politicians
21st-century Russian politicians
Eighth convocation members of the State Duma (Russian Federation)
Seventh convocation members of the State Duma (Russian Federation)